Misaki Doi is the defending champion but lost to Tamarine Tanasugarn 5–7, 5–7 in the quarterfinals.

Tamarine Tanasugarn won the title, defeating Kimiko Date-Krumm in the final 6–2, 7–5.

Seeds

Draw

Finals

Top half

Bottom half

References
 Main Draw
 Qualifying Draw

Dunlop World Challenge - Singles
Dunlop World Challenge
2011 Dunlop World Challenge